Hutton may refer to:

Places
Antarctica
 Hutton Cliffs, Ross Island
 Hutton Mountains

Australia
 Hutton Sandstone Formation

Canada
 Hutton, Alberta, a locality
 Hutton, British Columbia,  a railway point
 Hutton railway station, British Columbia

England
 Hutton, Cumbria, a civil parish
 Hutton, Essex, a former village, now a commuter suburb of Brentwood 
 Hutton, Lancashire, a village and civil parish
 Hutton, Somerset, a village and civil parish
 Hutton Cranswick, East Riding of Yorkshire, formed by the merger of two villages still referred to by their separate names
 Hutton Village, a village near Guisborough in North Yorkshire

Scotland
 Hutton, Scottish Borders, a village
 Hutton Castle, Scottish Borders
 Hutton oilfield, North Sea

United States
 Hutton, Indiana, an unincorporated town
 Hutton, Maryland, an unincorporated community
 Hutton Township, Coles County, Illinois

Outer space
 Hutton (lunar crater)
 Hutton (Martian crater)
 6130 Hutton, an asteroid

People
 Hutton (surname), a list of people
 Hutton Gibson (born 1918), American writer, Jeopardy game show champion, and father of actor and director Mel Gibson
 Hutton Webster (1875–1955), American anthropologist, economist and sociologist

Other uses
 Hutton Companies, a Southern California real estate developer
 Hutton Gate railway station, a railway station near Hutton Lowcross, North Yorkshire, England, closed 1964.
 Hutton Grammar School, Lancashire, England
 Hutton Hall (Guisborough), a grade II listed building near Hutton Lowcross, North Yorkshire, England
 Hutton Honors College, the honors program of Indiana University